Lucía Leticia Méndez Pérez (born January 26, 1955) is a Mexican telenovela and film actress, top model and singer. Méndez was born in León, Guanajuato, Mexico.

Career 

In 2011, Lucía starred in Mexico the telenovela Esperanza del Corazón ("Hoping Heart"), with Fernando Allende and the Mexican Broadway star Bianca Marroquín. Also in 2011, she was inducted into the Paseo de las Luminarias (Plaza of the Stars) for her work as a recording artist and in television.

Feuds

"Madonna" 
In 2006, Lucía and her then boyfriend were present at a Madonna concert in Miami. Lucía was sitting in the front row and while everyone in the audience was standing, she was the one who didn't stand up. Madonna noticed this and started gesturing for her to stand up. Lucía pointed out that she couldn't because her knee hurt due to a painful injury.  Madonna got so furious, that she asked security to tell her that she had to stand up, to which Lucia replied, "I'm going to call my lawyer." Then Madonna said "fuck you" to her.

Albums
2018: Feel My Body 
2017: En Escena (en vivo)
2015: Bailan
2013: Lo Esencial de Lucía Méndez 40 Aniversario
2010: Canta un Homenaje a Juan Gabriel
2009: Otra Vez Enamorada... con un Nuevo Amanecer
2004: Vive
2001: 20 Grandes Éxitos
2000: Golpe Bajo (Original Soundtrack)
1999: Dulce Romance
1998: Todo o Nada
1994: Señora Tentación
1993: Se Prohibe
1992: Marielena (Original Soundtrack)
1991: Bésame
1990: Amor de Nadie (Single)
1989: Luna Morena
1988: Mis Íntimas Razones
1987: Acapulco, Acapulco (Single)
1986: Castígame
1986: Lo Mejor de Lucía Méndez
1985: Te Quiero
1984: Sólo Una Mujer
1983: Enamorada
1982: Cerca de Tí
1980: Regálame Esta Noche ... Colorina
1979: Sé Feliz
1978: Viviana (Original Soundtrack)
1977: La Sonrisa del Año
1977: No Te Buscaré (Single)
1976: Lucía Méndez
1975: Siempre estoy Pensando en Tí

Filmography

Film

Television

Singles 

 Te Vas O Te Quedas (2014)
 Esperanza del Corazón / Cerca (2011)
Amor Eterno (2010)
¿Por qué Me Haces Llorar? (2010)
Amor de un Rato (2010)
Un Nuevo Amanecer (2009)
Enamorada (2009)
Aunque Me Duela el Alma / El Cubano está Loco(2004)
La Pareja Dispareja (2004)
Golpe Bajo / Rehilete (2000)
Perdóname(1999)
Corazón de Acero (1998)
Todo o Nada (1998)
Ya la pagarás (1998)
Señora Tentación / Pecadora (1994)
Pobre Corazón (1994)
Vete (1993)
Se Acabó / Se Me Antoja (1992)
Bésame / La que Más Te ha Querido (1992)
Amor de Nadie / Amor de Nadie (Instrumental) (1990)
Tormenta de Verano / Luna Morena (Creo en el Amor) (1990)
Juntos por Costumbre / No Hay Hombres (1990)
Nos Aburriremos Juntos / ¿Quién Será? (1989)
Aventurero (1988)
Un Alma en Pena (1988)
Morir un Poco (1988)
Acapulco, Acapulco (1987)
Yo No Sé Quererte Más / Amor por Amor (1987)
Castígame / Mariposa (1986)
Amor Impossible / No, No Más (1986)
Infinitamente / México (1985)
Te Quiero / La Ola de Amor (1985)
Corazón de Piedra / Don Corazón (1984)
Solo una Mujer / La Luna de Cancún (1984)
Mi Amor, Amor / Cobarde (1983)
Enamorada / Super Miedo (1983)
Te Tengo en Mis Manos / Contigo o sin Ti (1982)
Culpable o Innocente / ¿Qué Clase de Hombre Eres Tú? (1982)
Atada a Nada / Amo Todo de Ti (1982)
Colorina / Regálame Esta Noche (1980)
Amor de Madrugada / Paloma Blanca (1979)
Verte una Vez Más / Tengo Sed (1979)
Viviana / Viviana (Instrumental) (1978)
Asómate a Mi Alma / La Estrella (1977)
La Sonrisa del Año / Presentimiento (1977)
No Te Buscaré / Yo Sé que Está en Tu Corazón (1977)
Hay que Saber Perder / Cariño Nuevo (1976)
Frente a Frente / Mi Vida está Rosa (1976)
No Me lo Tomes a Mal / Te Solté la Rienda (1975)
¿Por qué Me Haces Llorar? / La Última Canción (1975)
Siempre Estoy Pensando en Ti / ¿Qué Pasó Corazoncito? (1975)

Video clips 

Te Vas O Te Quedas (2014)
Cerca (2011)
Amor de un Rato (2010)
La Pareja Dispareja (2004)
Perdóname (1999)
Ya la Pagarás (1998)
Señora Tentación (1994)
Vete (1993)
Se Acabó (1992)
La que Más Te ha Querido (1992)
Un Poquito de Sabor (1991)
Tormenta de Verano (1991)
Amor de Nadie (1990)
Devuélveme el Amor (1990)
Secreto (1990)
Juntos por Costumbre (Versión 2) (1990)
Luna Morena (1990)
Juntos por Costumbre (Versión 1) (1990)
Nube Viajera (1990)
No Hay Hombres (1990)
¿Quién Será? (1989)
Nos Aburriremos Juntos (1989)
Aventurero (1988)
Un Alma en Pena (1988)
Yo No Sé Quererte Más (Versión 2) (1987)
Yo No Sé Quererte Más (Versión 1) (1987)
Castígame (1986)
Amor Impossible (1986)
La Ola de Amor (1985)
Te Quiero (1985)
Don corazón (1984)
Corazón de Piedra (1984)
La Luna de Cancún (1984)
Sólo una Mujer (1984)
Amor a Dos (1983)
Corazón de Fresa (1983)
Cobarde (1983)
Márchate de Aquí (1983)
Parte de Mí (1983)
Margarita (1983)
Amor Volcánico (1983)
Enamorada (1983)
Escúchame (1982)
Contigo o sin Ti (1982)
¿Qué Clase de Hombre Eres Tú? (1982)
Culpable o Innocente (1982)
Estrellita del Sur (1977)
Frente a Frente (1976)
¿Qué Pasó Corazoncito? (1975)

References

External links 
 Lucía Méndez official Web Site in English & Spanish
 
 

1955 births
Living people
Mexican telenovela actresses
Mexican television actresses
Mexican film actresses
Mexican women singers
Actresses from Guanajuato
Singers from Guanajuato
Mexican emigrants to the United States
American expatriates in Mexico
20th-century Mexican actresses
21st-century Mexican actresses
People from León, Guanajuato
Women in Latin music